Die Kölner Akademie - Damals und Heute are a German baroque and classical music orchestra founded in 1996 and based in Cologne. They are led by the American conductor Michael Alexander Willens who studied at the Juilliard School in New York.

Selected discography
For Raumklang:
 Johann Valentin Meder: St. Matthew Passion, Kennedy, Merkel, Türk, Hilz, Kölner Akademie, Michael Alexander Willens, Raumklang

For Carus Records
 Johann Sebastian Bach: St Mark Passion, Dominique Horwitz (speaker), ensemble amarcord, Kölner Akademie, Michael Alexander Willens, Carus 2009

For BIS Classics:
 Mozart: Piano concertos No.9 K 271, No.12 K 414, Ronald Brautigam, fortepiano, Kölner Akademie, Michael Alexander Willens, BIS
 Mozart: Piano concertos N.24 K 495, No.25 K 503, Ronald Brautigam, fortepiano, Kölner Akademie, Michael Alexander Willens, BIS
 Mozart: Piano concertos N.17 K 453, No.26 K 537, Ronald Brautigam, fortepiano, Kölner Akademie, Michael Alexander Willens, BIS

ARS
For ARS Produktion:
 Bernhard Crusell: Clarinet concertos, Eric Hoeprich, clarinet, Kölner Akademie, Michael Alexander Willens, Forgotten Treasures Vol. 1, ARS-Produktion
 Franz Danzi: Bassoon concertos, Jane Gower, bassoon Kölner Akademie, Michael Alexander Willens, Forgotten Treasures Vol. 2, ARS-Produktion
 Viennese Double bass concertos, David Sinclair, double bass, Kölner Akademie, Michael Alexander Willens, Forgotten Treasures Vol. 3, ARS-Produktion
 Johann Wilhelm Wilms: Symphony and Concertos, Paolo Giacometti, Hammerklavier, Martin Sandhoff, flute, Kölner Akademie, Michael Alexander Willens, Forgotten Treasures Vol. 4, ARS-Produktion
 Bernhard Romberg: Symphonies, Kölner Akademie, Michael Alexander Willens Forgotten Treasures Vol. 5, ARS-Produktion
 Chant d’ Automne, French Horn music, Ulrich Hübner, natural and valvehorn, Kölner Akademie, Michael Alexander Willens, Forgotten Treasures Vol. 6, ARS-Produktion
 Johann Christian Fischer and Carl Stamitz Oboe concertos, Michael Niesemann, oboe, Kölner Akademie, Michael Alexander Willens, Forgotten Treasures Vol. 7, ARS-Produktion
 Sigismund Ritter von Neukomm: Early works, Marianne Beate Kielland (mezzo soprano); Riko Fukuda, Hammerklavier, Kölner Akademie, Michael Alexander Willens, Forgotten Treasures Vol. 8, ARS-Produktion
 Virtuoso Trumpet Music from the 19th Century, Robert Vanryne, keyed trumpet, Kölner Akademie, Michael Alexander Willens, Forgotten Treasures Vol. 9, ARS-Produktion
 19th Century Harp concertos, Masumi Nagasawa, single pedal harp, Kölner Akademie, Michael Alexander Willens, Forgotten Treasures Vol. 10, ARS-Produktion

CPO
For CPO Records:
 Ferdinand Ries: Overtures, violin concerto and concerto for 2 horns, Anton Steck, Violin, Teunis van der Zwaart, Erwin Wieringa, natural horn, Kölner Akademie, Michael Alexander Willens, CPO
 Johann Wenzel Kalliwoda: Symphony No 2, Symphony No 4, Concert overture in f, Kölner Akademie, Michael Alexander Willens, CPO
 Anton Eberl: Piano concertos, Paolo Giacometti, Riko Fukuda, Hammerklavier, Kölner Akademie, Michael Alexander Willens, CPO
 Sigismund Ritter von Neukomm: Three Orchestral Fantasies, Sinfonie heroique, Kölner Akademie, Michael Alexander Willens, CPO
 Johann Wenzel Kalliwoda: Concert Overtures and Concertinos for Violin and Orchestra Ariadne Dastalakis, violin, Kölner Akademie, Michael Alexander Willens, CPO
 Johann Mattheson: Der Liebreiche und Geduldige David: Oratorio for Soloists, Choir and Orchestra, Kennedy, Eittinger, Ciolek, Hilz, Spogis, Kölner Akademie, Michael Alexander Willens, CPO
 Johann Mattheson: Das Größte Kind: Christmas Oratorio for Soloists, Choir and Orchestra, Rydén, Gramß, Schmid, Türk, Friedrich, Dahlmann, Kölner Akademie, Michael Alexander Willens, CPO
 Johann Mattheson: Die heilsame Geburt, Christmas Oratorio for Soloists, Choir and Orchestra: Kennedy, Crookes, Eitinger, Post, MacLeod, Kölner Akademie, Michael Alexander Willens, CPO
 Francesco Durante: Neapolitan music for Christmas, Mameli, Eittinger, Post, MacLeod, Kölner Akademie, Michael Alexander Willens, CPO 
 Francesco Durante: Neapolitan music for Christmas II, Monica Piccinini, Christina Kühne, Ursula Eittinger, Alberto ter Doest, Kölner Akademie, Michael Alexander Willens, CPO 
 Carl Heinrich Graun: Osteroratorium. Nina Koufochristou, Dagmar Saskova, Jan Kobow, Andreas Wolf, Kölner Akademie CPO
 Telemann: Lukas-Passion (1728) Marcus Ullmann, Wolfgang Klose, Christian Hilz, Raimonds Spogis. CPO
 forthcoming Händel: Chandos Anthems, Backus, Krasiak, Ciolek, Hilz, Kölner Akademie, Michael Alexander Willens, CPO

References

German symphony orchestras
Instrumental early music groups
Musical groups established in 1996
Music in Cologne